Esteban Azcue (born 24 February 1944) is a Spanish sports shooter. He competed in the mixed trap event at the 1976 Summer Olympics.

References

1944 births
Living people
Spanish male sport shooters
Olympic shooters of Spain
Shooters at the 1976 Summer Olympics
Place of birth missing (living people)
20th-century Spanish people